Altlinster is a village in the commune of Junglinster, in central Luxembourg.  , it has a population of 127 inhabitants.

See also

 List of villages in Luxembourg

References

Junglinster
Villages in Luxembourg